This article lists the colonial governors of the Comoros, from the establishment of the French suzerainty over the Comoro Islands in 1841 until the independence of the Comoros in 1975.

List of officeholders

(Dates in italics indicate de facto continuation of office)

For continuation after independence, see: List of heads of state of the Comoros

See also
 Politics of the Comoros
 List of sultans on the Comoros
 List of heads of state of the Comoros
 List of prime ministers of the Comoros
 List of colonial and departmental heads of Mayotte

External links
 World Statesmen – Comoros

History of the Comoros
Comoros
Comoros-related lists